αr14 is a family of bacterial small non-coding RNAs with representatives in a broad group of α-proteobacteria. The first member of this family (Smr14C2) was found in a Sinorhizobium meliloti 1021 locus located in the chromosome (C). It was later renamed  NfeR1 (Nodule Formation Efficiency RNA) and shown to be highly expressed in salt stress and during the symbiotic interaction on legume roots. Further homology and structure conservation analysis identified 2 other chromosomal copies and 3 plasmidic ones. Moreover, full-length Smr14C homologs have been identified in several nitrogen-fixing symbiotic rhizobia  (i.e. R. leguminosarum bv.viciae, R. leguminosarum bv. trifolii, R. etli, and several Mesorhizobium species),  in the plant pathogens belonging to Agrobacterium species  (i.e. A. tumefaciens, A. vitis, A. radiobacter, and Agrobacterium H13) as well as in a broad spectrum of Brucella species (B. ovis, B. canis, B. abortus and  B. microtis, and several biovars of B. melitensis). αr14C RNA species are 115-125 nt long (Table 1) and share a well defined common secondary structure (Figure 1). Most of the αr14 transcripts can be catalogued as trans-acting sRNAs expressed from well-defined promoter regions of independent transcription units within intergenic regions (IGRs) of the α-proteobacterial genomes (Figure 5).

Discovery and structure

Smr14C2 sRNA was described by del Val et al., as a result of a computational comparative genomic approach consisting in the integration of complementary strategies, designed to search for novel sRNA-encoding genes in the intergenic regions (IGRs) of the reference S. meliloti 1021 strain (http://iant.toulouse.inra.fr/bacteria/annotation/cgi/rhime.cgi) . Northern hybridization experiments confirmed that the predicted smr14C2 locus did express a single transcript of the expected size, which accumulated differentially in free-living and endosymbiotic bacteria. TAP-based 5’-RACE experiments mapped the transcription start site (TSS) of the full-length Smr14C transcript to the 1,667,613 nt position in the S. meliloti 1021 genome (http://iant.toulouse.inra.fr/bacteria/annotation/cgi/rhime.cgi) whereas the 3’-end was assumed to be located at the 1,667,491 nt position matching the last residue of the consecutive stretch of Us of a bona fide Rho-independent terminator (Figure 5). Parallel and later studies in which Smr14C2 transcript is referred to as sra38 or Sm7', independently confirmed the expression this sRNA in  S. melilloti  and in its closely related strain 2011. Recent deep sequencing-based characterization of the small RNA fraction (50-350 nt) of S. meliloti 2011 further confirmed the expression of Smr14C2 (here referred to as SmelC397), and mapped the 5’- and 3´-ends of the full-length transcript to the same position in the S. meliloti 1021 genome.

The nucleotide sequence of Smr14C2 was initially used as query to search against the Rfam database (version 10.0;http://www.sanger.ac.uk/Software/Rfam). This homology search rendered no matches to known bacterial sRNA in this database. Smr14C2 was next BLASTed with default parameters against all the currently available bacterial genomes (1,615 sequences at 20 April 2011; https://www.ncbi.nlm.nih.gov;). The regions exhibiting significant homology to the query sequence (78-89% similarity) were extracted to create a Covariance Model (CM) from a seed alignment using Infernal (version1.0) (Figure 2). This CM was used in a further search for new members of the αr9 family in the existing bacterial genomic databases and resumed in the following Table 2:

The results were manually inspected to deduce a consensus secondary structure for the family (Figure 1 and Figure 2). The consensus structure was also independently predicted with the program locARNATE with very similar predictions. The manual inspection of the sequences found with the CM using Infernal allowed finding 101  homolog sequences. The rhizobial species encoding the 36 closer homologs to Smr14C2 were: S. medicae and S. fredii, two R. leguminosarum trifolii strains (WSM2304 and WSM1325), two R. etli strains CFN 42 and CIAT 652, the reference R. leguminosarum bv. viciae 3841 strain, and the Agrobacterium species A. vitis,A. tumefaciens, A. radiobacter and A. H13. All these sequences showed significant Infernal E-values (5.63E-29   - 8.16E-18) and bit-scores. The rest of the sequences found with the model showed high E-values between (1.33E-17 and 8.79E-03) but lower bit-scores and are encoded by  Brucella species (B. ovis, B. canis, B. abortus, B. microtis, and several biobars of B. melitensis), Brucella anthropi and the Mesorhizobum species loti, M. ciceri and  M. BNC.

The model identified five additional copies in the S. meliloti genome, locating two of them in tandem in the same IGR (Smr14C2, Smr14C3). The same results were obtained for S. medicae (Smedr14C1, Smedr14C2), S. fredii (Sfr14C1, Sfr14C2), M. loti (Mlr14C1, Mlr14C2)  and M. ciceri (Mcr14C1, Mcr14C2).

Concerning the additional copies found in the S. meliloti genome, the expression of four out of the five copies have been independently confirmed in recent studies: 
 Smr14C3 referred as: sra38, Sm7 or SmelC398
 Smr14A1 referred as: sma8 or SmelA075
 Smr14A2 referred as: SmelA099
 Smr14B referred as: SmelB161

There are no experimental evidences up to now for the predicted copy Smr14C1.

Expression information

Parallel studies assessed Smr14C expression in S. meliloti 1021 under different biological conditions; i.e. bacterial growth in TY, minimal medium (MM) and luteolin-MM broth and endosymbiotic bacteria (i.e. mature symbiotic alfalfa nodules) and high salt stress, oxidative stress and cold and hot shock stresses. Expression of Smr14C2 in free-living bacteria was found to be growth-dependent, being the gene strongly down-regulated when bacteria entered the stationary phase. Expression of Smr14C2 increased ~5-fold in nodules when compared with free-living bacteria (log phase TY or MM cultures), suggesting the induction of these sRNAs during bacterial infection and/or bacteroid differentiation. 
Recent deep sequencing data found differential expression of the plasmic copies. Smr14A1 showed differential expression conditions, with a very low expression level in complex medium and in the same medium at decreased temperature. However, it was strongly up-regulated by heat-shock stress. Smr14B showed an increase of its expression in the stationary phase greater that 8 fold. Moreover, also showed a week upregulation (<8 fold) upon acidic, basic and oxidative stress

Promoter analysis

All the promoter regions of the αr14 family members examined so far are very conserved in a sequence stretch extending up to 120 bp upstream of the transcription start site of the sRNA. All closest homolog loci have recognizable σ70-dependent promoters showing a -35/-10 consensus motif CTTAGAC-n17-CTATAT, which has been previously shown to be widely conserved among several other genera in the α-subgroup of proteobacteria. To identify binding sites for other known transcription factors we used the fasta sequences provided by RegPredict(http://regpredict.lbl.gov/regpredict/help.html), and used those position weight matrices (PSWM) provided by RegulonDB  (http://regulondb.ccg.unam.mx). We built PSWM for each transcription factor from the RegPredict sequences using the Consensus/Patser program, choosing the best final matrix for motif lengths between 14 and 30  a threshold average E-value < 10E-10 for each matrix was established, (see "Thresholded consensus" in http://gps-tools2.its.yale.edu). Moreover, we searched for conserved unknown motifs using MEME (http://meme.sdsc.edu/meme4_6_1/intro.html) and used relaxed regular expressions (i.e. pattern matching) over all Smr14C2 homologs promoters. 
This studies revealed two well defined groups of loci, the first one represented by the closest homologs (Figure 5) that presented a 26 bp long region very conserved between positions -40 and -75, marked as conserved MEME motif in (Figure 5), but no significant similarity to known transcription factor binding sites matrices could be established. A group of not so closely related members of the αr14 family constituted the second group of conserved promoters (Figure6). They presented a different promoter region, very well conserved across all members and an additional unknown 20 bp motif.

Genomic context

Most of the members of the αr14 family are trans-encoded sRNAs transcribed from independent promoters in chromosomal IGRs. Many of the neighboring genes of the seed alignment's members were not annotated and thus were further manually curated.  
The tandem copies in the Sinorhizobium group's genomes (Smr14C2, Smr14C3, Smedr14C1, Smedr14C2, Sfr14C1, Sfr14C2) presented a conserved genomic context. The gene upstream coded for an unknown protein containing the domain DUF1127 and the gene downstream coded for a trigger factor.

Partially conserved genomic context, DUF1127 protein upstream and 5-keto-4-deoxyuronate isomerase downstream, was found for the plasmidic copies of the Rhizobium group Rlt1325r14p02, Rlvr14p11, Rlt2304r14p02, and ReCIATr14A.

A similar case of partial genomic conservation, DUF1127 protein upstream and tRNA (uracil-5-)-methyltransferase downstream, was found in the case of the Mesorhizobium species, which also presented tandem copies M. loti (Mlr14C1, Mlr14C2) and M. ciceri (Mcr14C1, Mcr14C2). The same context was found for the second copy in the chromosome II of Brucella anthropi (Oar14CII2) and the second copy in chromosome I in the Brucella group  (Bor14CI2, Bcr14CI2, Bmir14CI2, Bs1330r14CI2, Bm16Mr14CI1, BaS19r14CI2, Bm23457r14CI1, BMEA_A0934, BruAb1_0906, Ba19941r14CI2). In all these cases the sRNAs did appear as single copy in their IGR. Bs23445r14CI2, Bmar14CI2, and Rlvr14C2 shared the gene coding for tRNA (uracil-5-)-methyltransferase downstream, but did not share the genes coding upstream.

The results showed two other well-conserved genomic contexts. One with a gene coding for nicotinic acid mononucleotide adenylyltransferase upstream and a gene coding for a molybdenum ABC transporter downstream, which is shared by the third copy of ar14 family in the A. radiobacter genome (Arr14CI3) and in the Rhizobium group genomes (ReCFNr14C3, Rlt1325r14C3, Rlvr14C3, Rlt2304r14C3). The second group is formed by the first copy in the Chromosome I in the Brucellas genomes that share the gene upstream coding for an LrgB membrane protein and the gene downstream a coding for an alpha/beta hydrolase.

Additional files:

 Additional file 1
 Additional file 2
 Additional file 3
 Additional file 4
 Additional file 5
 Additional file 6
 Additional file 7
 Additional file 8
 Additional file 9
 Additional file 10
 Additional file 11

References 

RNA